David Darom (born 1943 in Bombay, India, died 28 April 2021 in Jerusalem, Israel), was an Israeli marine biologist and nature photographer. Darom immigrated as a child with his family to Israel in 1949, settling down in Jerusalem. He lived with his family in Jerusalem, Israel, retiring in 2007 after 35 years as head of the Department of Scientific Photography at the Hebrew University of Jerusalem.

Work as marine biologist 
In 1972, he received a PhD in Marine Biology. He documented the wildlife of the region on land, photographing many of the wild flowers of Israel, with a special attention to the documentation of the Plants of the Bible. Underwater he photographed many hundreds of fish species as well as marine invertebrates from the Red Sea and the Mediterranean Sea. Upeneus davidaromi, a species of goatfish found in the Red Sea, was named in his honour in 2001.

Work as knife collector 
His interest in modern handmade (Custom) art knives as an avid collector led him in 2002 to produce a series of large format Art Books on the subject.
In 2003 he put together the first volume (in English), "Art and Design in Modern Custom Folding Knives", and in 2005 he published "Art and Design in Modern Custom Fixed-Blade Knives". In 2006 he came out with "The Art of Modern Custom Knifemaking" and in 2007 "Modern Custom Knives – The Great Collections". Several of these large format Art Books have been translated into 5 additional languages.

In 2008 Darom published the first book in a new series "Custom Knifemakers of the World" with "Edmund Davidson, The Art of the Integral Knife".
In 2009 Darom published the 2nd book in this series, "Tim Hancock, The Art of the Western Bladesmith" and a 3rd volume, "The Art Knives of Van Barnett & Dellana" was introduced in 2011.

In October 2010, Darom was awarded the Nate Posner Memorial Award by the Knifemakers' Guild at their annual meeting in Louisville, Kentucky (USA), recognizing his "Outstanding Service in the Promotion of Handcrafted Cutlery".

Published Books

Nature UNDERWATER & on LAND 
 Darom D. (1976) "The Red Sea", Sadan Publishing House, pp 124, 105 u/w photographs (English +).
 Darom D., Fridman D., Levi E. (1977) "Coral World" A color guide, Sadan Publishing House, (English).
 Darom D., Baranes A. (1980) "The Shark", Massada Israel, pp 118, full color, Cat. No. 00-1505 (Hebrew).
 Plitman U., Heyn C., Danin A., Shmida A., photography: Darom D. (1983) "The Pictorial Color Guide to Wild Flowers Of Israel", Massada Israel, pp 342, 800 color photographs, Cat. No. 00-2506 (Hebrew).
 Darom D. (1984) "Life in the Red Sea", Massada Israel, pp 168, Cat. No. 00-1750 (Hebrew).
 Shmida A., Darom D. (1986) "Flowers of Jerusalem", Cana/ Carta, pp 250, full color  (Hebrew).
 Shmida A., Darom D. (1986) "The Photographic Color Guide to Wild Flowers of Israel" Part I, Keter, pp 308, Cat. No. 534522 (Hebrew).
 Shmida A., Darom D. (1987) "The Photographic Color Guide to Wild Flowers of Israel" Part II, Keter, pp 334, Cat. No. 535960 (Hebrew).
 Darom D. (1989) "The Color Guide to Nature Photography", Keter, pp 240, Cat. No. 536120 (Hebrew).
 Darom D. (1990), "Beautiful Plants of The Bible", Palphot Ltd, pp 48,  (English +).
 Shmida A., Darom D. (1991) "The Color Guide To Trees", Keter, pp 328,  (Hebrew).
 Darom D., Tsurnamal M. (1992) "The Color Guide to the Seashores of Israel", Keter, pp 272,  (Hebrew).
 Darom D. (1996) "Animals of the Bible" Palphot Ltd, pp 48,  (English +).
 Darom D. (1996) "Wildflower" Album format full color, Keter, pp 120,  (Hebrew).
 Golani D., Darom D. (1997) "Handbook of the Fishes of Israel", Keter, full color, pp 270,  (Hebrew).
 Golani D., Ozturk B., Basusta N., photography: Darom D. (2006) "Fishes of the Eastern Mediterranean", TUDAV, full color, pp 260,  (English).

Modern Handmade (Custom) ART KNIVES
 Darom D. (2003) "Art and Design in Modern Custom Folding Knives", Saviolo Publisher, pp 256,  (English +).
 Darom D. (2005) "Art and Design in Modern Custom Fixed-Blade Knives", Saviolo Publisher, pp 276,  (English +).
 Darom D. (2006) "The Art of Modern Custom Knifemaking", Saviolo Publisher, pp 252,  (English +).
 Darom D. (2007) "Modern Custom Knives The Great Collections", Saviolo Publisher, pp 288,  (English +).
 Darom D. (2008) "Edmund Davidson The Art of the Integral Knife" Published by the author *, pp 144, .
 Darom D. (2009) "Tim Hancock The Western Bladesmith", Published by the author, pp 152, .
 Darom D. (2010) "The World of Art Knives", Published by the author, pp 272, .
 Darom D. (2011) "The Art Knives of Van Barnett & Dellana" Published by the author, pp 152 full color, .

Gallery – selected photographs

Plants

Marine fauna

References

External links 

 ganoksin.com

1943 births
Living people
Israeli photographers
Nature photographers
Indian emigrants to Israel
Academic staff of the Hebrew University of Jerusalem
Israeli marine biologists
Scientists from Mumbai
People from Jerusalem